Pe'er is a given name and a surname. It may refer to:

 Dana Pe'er (born 1971), biologist
 Daniel Pe'er (1943–2017), Israeli television host and newsreader
 Shahar Pe'er (born 1987), Israeli tennis player
 Pe'er Tasi (born 1984), Israeli singer and songwriter
 Pe'er Visner (born 1957), Israeli politician
 Aviva Pe'er,  Israeli beauty queen